CRIF is an acronym for the Conseil Représentatif des Institutions juives de France.

CRIF may also refer to:

 CRIF, the old name of the knowledge centre for the technology industry in Belgium, now called Sirris
 Closed Reduction with Internal Fixation, a surgical technique for correcting displaced fractures, especially at the hip.